The Willows is an album by Jim Jupp, under the pseudonym of Belbury Poly. The album was released in 2004 on the Ghost Box Music label. It is named after a short story by Algernon Blackwood.

Track listing

External links
Stylus Magazine review of The Willows

Belbury Poly albums
Ghost Box Music albums
2004 albums